Betty Balfour (born Florence Lilian Woods; 27 March 1902 – 4 November 1977) was an English screen actress, popular during the silent era, and known as the "British Mary Pickford" and "Britain's Queen of Happiness". She was best known to audiences for her Squibs series of films.

Life and career
Balfour was the most popular actress in Britain in the 1920s, and in 1927 she was named by the Daily Mirror as the country's favourite world star. Her talent was most evident in the Squibs comedy series produced by George Pearson, while in his Love, Life and Laughter (1923), rediscovered in 2014, and  Reveille (1924), she demonstrated a serious side to her character. Her role as a wealthy heiress in Somebody's Darling (1925) was an attempt to break out of her previous role as Squibs, to avoid typecasting.

She made her stage debut in 1913, and was appearing in Medora at the Alhambra Theatre in Leicester Square when T. A. Welsh and Pearson saw and signed her for Nothing Else Matters in 1920. After replacing Gertrude Lawrence on stage in The Midnight Follies, Balfour was back with Pearson with her first starring role in Mary Find the Gold.

In 1916 she starred in Fred Karno's all female revue, 'All Women,' notable at the time for its all female cast, including stage manager, musical director and advanced agent.

Balfour made no attempt to break into Hollywood but like Ivor Novello she was able to export her talents to mainland Europe. She starred in the German films, Die sieben Töchter der Frau Gyurkovics and Die Regimentstochter; she also worked for Marcel L'Herbier in Le Diable au cœur, for Louis Mercanton in Croquette and La Petite Bonne du palace, and for Géza von Bolváry in Bright Eyes.

Back in Britain, she also starred in Alfred Hitchcock's Champagne (1928). Balfour's sound debut, The Nipper (1930), based on the Squibs character, was only moderately successful. Her popularity diminished in the 1930s, though she played a supporting role to Jessie Matthews in Evergreen (1934), appeared with John Mills in Forever England (1935) and played the matriarch in 29 Acacia Avenue (1945).

Balfour had less fortune in her private life. Her marriage to composer Jimmy Campbell went on the rocks in 1941 after ten years and an attempt of a comeback on the stage failed in 1952. She died at age 74 in Weybridge, Surrey.

Filmography

 Nothing Else Matters (1920) – Sally
 Mary-Find-the-Gold (1921) – Mary Smith
 Squibs (1921) – Squibs Hopkins
 Squibs Wins the Calcutta Sweep (1922) – Squibs Hopkins
 Wee MacGregor's Sweetheart (1922) – Christine
 Mord Em'ly (1922) – Maud Emily
 Love, Life and Laughter (1923) – Tip-Toes
 Squibs' Honeymoon (1923) – Squibs Hopkins
 Squibs M.P. (1923) – Squibs Hopkins
 Reveille (1924) – Mick
 Satan's Sister (1925) – Jude Tyler
 Somebody's Darling (1925) – Joan Meredith
 Monte Carlo (1925) – Betty Oliver
 Blinkeyes (1926) – Blinkeyes
 Cinders (La petite bonne du palace) (1926)
 Pearl of Love (1925)
 La Petite Bonne du palace (The Maid at the Palace) (1926) – Betty Cinders
 The Sea Urchin (1926) – Fay Wynchbeck
 Topical Budget newsreel: "Cinema Stars' Rally" (1926) – self 
 Croquette (Monkey Nuts) (1928) – Croquette
 Le Diable au cœur (Little Devil May Care) (1928) – Ludivine Ducaille – une fille étrange
 Die sieben Töchter der Frau Gyurkovics (A Sister of Six) (1926) – Mizzi
 Champagne (1928) – The Girl
 A Little Bit of Fluff (1928) – Mamie Scott
 Die Regimentstochter (Daughter of the Regiment) (1929) – Marie – Regiments Daughter
 Paradise (1928) – Kitty Cranston
 Bright Eyes (Champagner) (1929) – Jenny
 The Vagabond Queen (1929) – Sally / Princess Zonia
 Raise the Roof (1930) – Maisie Grey
 The Nipper (also known as The Brat) (1930) – The Nipper
 My Old Dutch (1934) – Lil
 Evergreen (1934) – Maudie
 Brown on Resolution – Elizabeth Brown
 Squibs (1935) – Amelia "Squibs" Hopkins
 Eliza Comes to Stay (1936) – Eliza Vandan
 29 Acacia Avenue (1945) – Mrs. Robinson

References

External links
 
 
 Photographs and literature at Virtual History
 

1902 births
1977 deaths
English film actresses
English silent film actresses
English stage actresses
People from Chester-le-Street
20th-century English actresses